Eulalia is a genus of Asian, African, and Australian plants in the grass family.

Eulalia was named after the French botanical artist Eulalie Delile.

As a common name, "eulalia" refers to a grass in a different genus, Miscanthus sinensis.

 Species
 Eulalia annua – Australia
 Eulalia aurea – silky browntop – Australia, Thailand, Vietnam, Madagascar, Réunion, eastern + southeastern Africa (from Kenya to Mpumalanga)
 Eulalia bicornuta – Thailand, Myanmar
 Eulalia brevifolia  – Yunnan
 Eulalia contorta – China, Indian subcontinent, Southeast Asia
 Eulalia fastigiata – Indian subcontinent, New Guinea, Vietnam
 Eulalia fimbriata – Indian subcontinent, Myanmar, Thailand, Vietnam, Java, Lesser Sunda Islands
 Eulalia hirtifolia – Assam, Bhutan, Myanmar
 Eulalia leptostachys – New Guinea
 Eulalia leschenaultiana – Fujian, Guangdong, Jiangxi, Taiwan, Indian subcontinent, Southeast Asia
 Eulalia mackinlayi – Australia
 Eulalia madkotiensis – Uttarakhand 
 Eulalia manipurensis – Manipur, Assam, Bhutan, Bangladesh, Myanmar
 Eulalia maritima – Philippines
 Eulalia milsumi – Bukit Lompat Bayan in Selangor
 Eulalia mollis – Tibet, Uttarakhand, Nepal, Sikkim, Bhutan, Assam
 Eulalia monostachya – Cambodia, Thailand, Vietnam
 Eulalia pallens – Myanmar, Assam, Guangxi, Guizhou, Sichuan, Yunnan 
 Eulalia phaeothrix – India, Sri Lanka, Myanmar, Thailand, Vietnam, Hainan, Sichuan, Yunnan 
 Eulalia polyneura – Ethiopia, Kenya, Tanzania, Zambia, Mozambique
 Eulalia pruinosa – Yunnan
 Eulalia ridleyi – Peninsular Malaysia, Borneo
 Eulalia shrirangii – Maharashtra
 Eulalia siamensis – Myanmar, Thailand, Laos, Yunnan
 Eulalia smitinandiana – Thailand
 Eulalia splendens – Guangxi, Guizhou, Yunnan 
 Eulalia staintonii – Uttarakhand, Nepal
 Eulalia tetraseta – Thailand, Cambodia
 Eulalia thwaitesii – India, Sri Lanka
 Eulalia villosa – golden velvet grass – southern Africa, Madagascar, Thailand, Yunnan, India
 Eulalia yunnanensis – Yunnan

 formerly included
see Andropogon Bothriochloa Microstegium Miscanthus Polytrias Pseudopogonatherum Schizachyrium Spodiopogon

References

Andropogoneae
Poaceae genera
Grasses of Asia
Taxa named by Carl Sigismund Kunth